Aleksander Litwinowicz (1879 — 1948) was a Polish general who was a member of Polish Independence Organizations before World War I and a member of the Polish Legions during the war. Litwinowicz was promoted to general in 1924. From 1936 to 1939 he was the Second Deputy Minister of War and Chief of Army Administration.

Honours and awards
 Silver Cross of the Virtuti Militari
 Commander's Cross of the Order of Polonia Restituta
 Cross of Independence
 Order of the Cross of the Eagle, Class II (Estonia, 1935)

1879 births
1948 deaths
Military personnel from Saint Petersburg
Polish generals
Polish legionnaires (World War I)
Recipients of the Silver Cross of the Virtuti Militari
Recipients of the Military Order of the Cross of the Eagle, Class II
Commanders of the Order of Polonia Restituta
Recipients of the Cross of Independence
Lviv Polytechnic alumni